The 1964 Louisville Cardinals football team was an American football team that represented the University of Louisville in the Missouri Valley Conference (MVC) during the 1964 NCAA University Division football season. In their 19th season under head coach Frank Camp, the Cardinals compiled a 1–9 record (0–3 against conference opponents) and were outscored by a total of 217 to 70.

The team's statistical leaders included Tom LaFramboise	 with 1,380 passing yards, Ron Hall with 301 rushing yards, and Al MacFarlane with 446 receiving yards and 26 points scored.

Schedule

References

Louisville
Louisville Cardinals football seasons
Louisville Cardinals football